HitRadio Veronica is a Dutch radio station that broadcasts over the internet. On December 27, 2006 at 12:00pm TMF Radio was officially launched. TMF Radio until October 1, 2008 had a partnership between Sky Radio Group (Sienna Holding BV) and MTV Networks Benelux (TMF) and transmitted mostly hits from the cable frequency of Hitradio BV, which was acquired permanently in the spring of 2007 by Sky Radio Group and MTV Networks BV. MTV Networks has split on October 1, 2008 from TMF Radio and since then Sky Radio Group is the sole owner of the station, which now bears the name HitRadio Veronica. On January 3, 2011 the station ceased to listen to the broadcasts via cable and since the station is only through Internet.

The launch of the radio station gave quite a stir in the media. Ali B. (Ali Bouali) held on behalf of TMF, a fireworks launch with Yesser Roshdi ('Yes-R') and MTV VJs Miljouschka Witzenhausen and Valerio Zeno in accordance with TMF's 'most boring town in the Netherlands'; Staphorst. For this fireworks show MTV Networks BV had no license and was later claimed by the municipality for holding the event near a burial site of a 19-year-old. Staphorst wanted to sue Yes-R and Ali B for illegally using fireworks. It was found later on that the funeral of the 19-year-old boy was long before the fireworks show, so the charges were dropped.

History of branding
On 1 April 2009 it was announced that the name TMF Radio is renamed on April 3, 2009 to TMF HitRadio. After MTV Networks had retired on October 1, 2008 from the radio station, the Telegraaf Media Group decided to change the name to TMF HitRadio. No later than October 1, 2009 TMF Radio was scheduled to be renamed to HitRadio. The deadline for this was extended to November 2009.

On September 18, Sky Radio Group announced to change the name of TMF HitRadio per October 1, 2009 to HitRadio TMS, where TMS stood for "The Music Station".

At the end of September, Sky Radio Group announced that the scheduled name change was canceled. Ultimately, Sky Radio Group decided to change the name HitRadio. This name change is per 1 November 2009 implemented. Between July and December 1992, Sky Radio Group has been active with a short cable station called HitRadio. This radio station was on December 11, 1992 Radio 538. From that period, Sky Radio Group trademark of the departed to start again on 1 November 2009 'HitRadio' left over.

On September 1, 2010 the name was changed again, this time to HitRadio Veronica. Since January 3, 2011, the radio station only to hear over the internet rather than via cable. The name HitRadio Veronica has existed before, in 1995 when Veronica was also the commercial station HitRadio Veronica. HitRadio Veronica was the successor of HitRadio 1224. The station went on September 1, 1995 start on the medium wave frequency 828 kHz's (362 m) and 1224 kHz (245 m).

Logos

See also
 List of radio stations in the Netherlands

References

External links
 Official website 

Radio stations in the Netherlands
Mass media in Naarden
Radio stations established in 2006